Halo of Blood is the eighth studio album by Finnish melodic death metal band Children of Bodom. It was released on 7 June 2013 in Europe and 11 June in North America on Nuclear Blast Records. In Japan, the album was released by Marquee Inc. on 29 May 2013. This would be the last album with guitarist Roope Latvala before he was kicked out of the band in May 2015.

Production
Drummer Jaska Raatikainen posted on Facebook that the band has accumulated a number of songs for a new album. Raatikainen described the new material as dark and "also little [sic] 'black' [metal]-ish." In an interview before the band's first show in India, keyboardist Janne Wirman revealed that the band currently had four songs written, with plans to enter the studio at the end of 2012. Wirman predicted a release around April or May 2013. In mid November 2012, it was announced that the band had started recording demos of new material.

In January 2013, it was revealed that frontman/guitarist Alexi Laiho was finishing writing lyrics, and that recording would commence in February. Two song titles were also revealed. On 19 March 2013, the album's title was announced as Halo of Blood, and a track listing and cover artwork were revealed.

Some resources mention Swede Peter Tägtgren as the album's producer. However, according to Children of Bodom's Janne Wirman, "Peter was there just to produce the vocals" and the album was actually produced by Mikko Karmila and the band.

Cover Art

In this concept of this album, it shows the reaper who is wandering and walking in the forest and a frozen lake (Lake Bodom) where the dead people trapped under there while holding a scythe.

Critical reception
The album received mostly positive reviews, with an aggregated score of 66/100 on Metacritic, indicating favorable reviews. It was considered a return to form for the band, garnering a warmer reception from fans than their previous three albums.

Track listing

Personnel
Children of Bodom
Alexi Laiho – lead guitar, lead vocals
Roope Latvala – rhythm guitar, backing vocals
Henkka Seppälä – bass, backing vocals
Janne Wirman – keyboards
Jaska Raatikainen – drums, backing vocals

Production
Peter Tägtgren – vocal production
Mikko Karmila – production, engineering, mixing
Mika Jussila - mastering
Sami Saramäki – cover art

Charts

References

2013 albums
Children of Bodom albums
Nuclear Blast albums